Badugam is a medium-sized village located in Gurez Tehsil of Bandipore district in the Indian administered union territory of Jammu and Kashmir. It is located 111 kilometres (69 mi) from Bandipora.

Demographics 

According to the 2011 census of India, Badugam has 250 households. The literacy rate of Badugam village was 56.04% compared to 67.16% of Jammu and Kashmir. In Badugam Male literacy stands at 72.19% while the female literacy rate was 36.22%.

See also
 Gurez
 Tulail Valley
 Bandipora district
 Jammu and Kashmir

References

Villages in Bandipora district